Zach Hadge is an American strongman who won the 2016 Arnold Strongman Classic in the amateurs category. Next year he moved to the professional division and placed ninth.

Originally a football player, Hadge began competing as a strongman in 2010 while studying at Springfield College. In 2013 he won the national title in the 200 lb weight division. His brother Nick is also a strongman competitor.

References

Living people
American strength athletes
Year of birth missing (living people)